Stefan Mitrović (born 5 January 2002) is a Serbian footballer who currently plays as a right-back for Brodarac, on loan from Proleter Novi Sad.

Career statistics

Club

Notes

References

2002 births
Living people
Serbian footballers
Association football defenders
Serbian First League players
Red Star Belgrade footballers
RFK Grafičar Beograd players
FK Proleter Novi Sad players
FK Brodarac players